Atiaia consobrina is a species of beetle in the family Cerambycidae.

References

Cerambycini
Beetles described in 1892